America is a monthly Christian magazine published by the Jesuits of the United States and headquartered in midtown Manhattan. It contains news and opinion about Catholicism and how it relates to American politics and cultural life. It has been published continuously since 1909, and is also available online. 

With its Jesuit affiliation, America has been considered a liberal-leaning publication, and has been described by The Washington Post as "a favorite of Catholic liberal intellectuals".

History
The Jesuit provinces of the U.S.A. founded America in New York in 1909 and continue to publish the weekly printed magazine. Francis X. Talbot was editor-in-chief from 1936 to 1944.

Matt Malone became the fourteenth editor-in-chief on 1 October 2012, the youngest in the magazine's history. In September 2013, the magazine published an interview of Pope Francis with his fellow Jesuit Antonio Spadaro. 

In the spring of 2014, Malone announced that America would open a bureau in Rome with Gerard O'Connell as  correspondent.

On February 28, 2017, America launched a podcast, Jesuitical, targeted at young Catholics.

In 2022 Matt Malone concluded his editorship after ten years. 

Sam Sawyer became the fifteenth editor.

Controversy 
From 1998, when Thomas J. Reese became editor-in-chief, the magazine became controversial for publishing articles and opinion pieces at variance with the teaching of the Holy See on homosexuality, priestly celibacy, birth control, the debate about induced abortion and other matters. The Congregation for the Doctrine of the Faith proposed a committee of censors to review the magazine’s content. Reese resigned in May 2005. The National Catholic Reporter asserted that Reese's resignation was forced by the Vatican, although America and the Jesuit generalate in Rome denied this.

In 2009, under the leadership of Drew Christiansen, the editorial board gave support to an invitation for US President Barack Obama to receive an honorary degree at the University of Notre Dame. This was controversial, since the United States Conference of Catholic Bishops had discouraged Catholic Universities from honoring politicians and activists that supported abortion rights.

References

External links
 

1909 establishments in the United States
Weekly magazines published in the United States
Magazines established in 1909
Magazines published in New York City
Jesuit publications
Catholic magazines published in the United States
Religious magazines published in the United States